Miguel Fernández may refer to:
 Miguel Fernández (golfer)
 Miguel Fernández (footballer)
 Miguel Fernández (cyclist)
 Miguel Ángel Fernández Ordóñez, Spanish economist and politician